The Michael H. Goldberg NBCA Coach of the Year Award is an annual award awarded by the National Basketball Coaches Association. First offered in 2017, the winners of the award are shown below.

References

 2017 establishments in the United States
Basketball coaching awards in the United States